Bogumił Kobiela (31 May 1931 – 10 July 1969) was a Polish stage and film actor. He suffered serious injuries in a car crash on 2 July 1969 in Buszkowo. He died eight days later in hospital in Gdańsk.

Selected filmography

Kobilea appeared among other in the following films:
 Szkice węglem (1957)
 Ashes and Diamonds (1958)
 Heroism (1958)
 Bad Luck (1960)
 Goodbye to the Past (1960)
 Zacne grzechy (1963)
 The Saragossa Manuscript (1965)
 Three Steps on Earth (1965)
 Małżeństwo z rozsądku (1966)
  (1968)
 Przekładaniec (1968)
 The Doll (1968)
 Everything for Sale (1969)
  (1969)
 Hands Up! (released in 1985, shot in 1967)

References

External links
 

1931 births
1969 deaths
Actors from Katowice
People from Silesian Voivodeship (1920–1939)
Polish cabaret performers
Polish male film actors
Polish male stage actors
Road incident deaths in Poland
20th-century comedians
20th-century Polish male actors